John James Klumb (January 22, 1916 – July 23, 1998) was an American football end who played for two seasons in the National Football League (NFL). After playing college football for Washington State, he played for the Cincinnati Bengals of the American Professional Football Association (APFA) in 1939. He played for the Chicago Cardinals of the NFL from 1939 to 1940, and for the Pittsburgh Steelers in 1940.

References

1916 births
1998 deaths
People from Aurora, Nebraska
Players of American football from Nebraska
American football ends
Washington State Cougars football players
Cincinnati Bengals (AFL III) players
Chicago Cardinals players
Pittsburgh Steelers players